The Centennial Depot, also known as the Nici Self Historical Museum, was built in 1907 for the Laramie, Hahns Peak and Pacific Railway in Centennial, Wyoming, United States. In addition to railroad services, the depot housed a post office and, at times, a grocery store. The depot was operated by the Union Pacific Railroad until the early 1970s. Demolition was proposed, but the depot was purchased by the Centennial Valley Historical Association, which moved it a short distance to its present site. It is operated as the Nici Self Museum.

The long frame structure has a hipped roof with broad overhanging eaves. A projecting bay, arranged to look down the train line on the original site, is located near one end. It was listed on the National Register of Historic Places on November 8, 1982.

References

External links
 Nici Self Historical Museum website
 Centennial Depot at the Wyoming State Historic Preservation Office

National Register of Historic Places in Albany County, Wyoming
Railway stations in the United States opened in 1907
History museums in Wyoming
Union Pacific Railroad stations
Railway stations on the National Register of Historic Places in Wyoming
1907 establishments in Wyoming
Former railway stations in Wyoming